Howden-le-Wear is a village in County Durham, in England. Howden-le-Wear is approximately 1 mile south of the large market town of Crook. It has a number of shops including the village One Stop convenience store, hairdressers, butchers and the petrol station.
The 2011 Census reported that Howden has a population of 1,535.

References

External links

Villages in County Durham
Crook, County Durham